Henty railway station is heritage-listed railway station located on the Main South line in New South Wales, Australia. It serves the town of Henty. It was added to the New South Wales State Heritage Register on 2 April 1999.

History
Henty station opened in 1880 as Doodle Cooma. It was renamed Henty on 4 February 1891, and relocated to its present site in 1904. Opposite the platform lies a passing loop.

Services
Henty is served by two daily NSW TrainLink XPT services in each direction operating between Sydney and Melbourne. This is a request stop, so the train stops only if passengers booked to board/alight here.

Description 

The heritage-listed station complex includes the main station building, which is a timber building of type 7 design with a skillion roof completed in 1904, the brick platform dating from  1880, and the goods shed, built from corrugated iron with dimensions of 45'x17' and a curved semi-elliptical roof.

Heritage listing 
This site contains a range of items not often found together, comprising a simple skillion roof timber station building with a rare curved roof goods shed, one of the few remaining and an early gatehouse of which several are found on that section of line. Individually the goods shed is of high significance and together they form an important group of buildings. They are also prominent in the centre of the small town of Henty on the main street.

Henty railway station was listed on the New South Wales State Heritage Register on 2 April 1999 having satisfied the following criteria.

The place possesses uncommon, rare or endangered aspects of the cultural or natural history of New South Wales.

This item is assessed as historically rare. This item is assessed as arch. rare. This item is assessed as socially rare.

References

Attribution

External links

Henty station details Transport for New South Wales

Railway stations in Australia opened in 1880
Regional railway stations in New South Wales
New South Wales State Heritage Register
Main Southern railway line, New South Wales